The 2016 Étoile de Bessèges was a road cycling stage race that took place between 3 and 7 February 2016. The race was rated as a 2.1 event as part of the 2016 UCI Europe Tour. It was the 46th edition of the Étoile de Bessèges cycling race.

The race included five stages. The first four were road stages; the fifth and final stage was a  individual time trial. The champion of the 2015 Étoile de Bessèges, Bob Jungels, did not take part in the 2016 event as his team, was not among those invited.

The first two stages were won in sprints by Bryan Coquard, giving him the lead of the race. His teammate, Sylvain Chavanel, won a reduced sprint on the following stage to take over the race lead. He retained this lead in the following stage, won in a breakaway by Ángel Madrazo. He lost his lead, however, in the final stage time trial: he lost 30 seconds to Jérôme Coppel, who therefore won the race overall. Tony Gallopin came second, with Thibaut Pinot third. Chavanel finished fourth. Coquard won the points classification and FDJ won the team classification. Roland Thalmann won the mountains classification and Pierre Latour won the youth classification, having finished seventh overall.

Teams 

Nineteen teams were invited to start the race. These included four UCI WorldTeams, six UCI Professional Continental teams and nine UCI Continental teams.

Stages

Stage 1 

3 February 2016 – Bellegarde–Beaucaire,

Stage 2 

4 February –  Nîmes–Méjannes-le-Clap,

Stage 3 

5 February – Bessèges–Bessèges,

Stage 4 

6 February – Tavel–Laudun,

Stage 5 

7 February – Alès–Alès,  (ITT

References

External links 

 

Etoile de Besseges
Etoile de Besseges
2016